Ángel Manuel Cuéllar Llanos (born 13 September 1972) is a Spanish former footballer, currently a manager.

A left winger or a forward, his main assets were dribbling and scoring ability. He spent most of his professional career with Betis (nine years) and also had a brief unsuccessful spell with Barcelona, greatly marred by injury.

Over the course of eight La Liga seasons, Cuéllar amassed totals of 111 matches and 17 goals.

Playing career
Born in Villafranca de los Barros, Extremadura, Cuéllar made his debut for Real Betis' first team aged 18, in a 1–0 La Liga away loss against CD Logroñés on 4 November 1990, with the Andalusia side finishing the season last. He became an undisputed starter while in the Segunda División and scored 14 league in 1994–95 as they shot straight from the second tier into a final third place (on 25 September 1994, he scored a hat-trick in a 5–0 home victory over Sporting de Gijón); during the campaign, he also appeared in two friendlies with the Spain national team.

Cuéllar signed a five-year deal with league powerhouse FC Barcelona in June 1995. After suffering an anterior cruciate ligament injury in his first competitive appearance, a 2–0 win at Real Valladolid, he would feature sparingly throughout his two-year spell, as Barça won three trophies during 1996–97.

Returning to Betis in 1997 for 300 million pesetas, Cuéllar would be sacked by club president Manuel Ruiz de Lopera after the side were relegated at the end of the 1999–2000 season, under the allegations of "alarmingly low working performances". After two stints in division two, both ended in relegation, he moved to Levante UD of the same league, and was an important element in the Valencians' top-flight promotion, but would only appear seven times during the following campaign mainly due to injuries.

Subsequently, Cuéllar played three seasons in Tercera División, two with CD Lugo and his final with Narón BP. After 15 goals in 2007–08, best in the competition, he retired from professional football at almost 36.

Coaching career
In June 2015, Cuéllar was appointed manager of CCD Cerceda in the Spanish fourth tier. Two years later, he moved up one level to Segunda División B's FC Jumilla, being dismissed after failing to win a single match in eight.

Honours
Barcelona
Copa del Rey: 1996–97
Supercopa de España: 1996
UEFA Cup Winners' Cup: 1996–97

Levante
Segunda División: 2003–04

Spain U16
UEFA European Under-16 Championship: 1988

References

External links

Betisweb stats and bio 
Racing de Ferrol profile 

1972 births
Living people
People from Tierra de Barros
Sportspeople from the Province of Badajoz
Spanish footballers
Footballers from Extremadura
Association football wingers
Association football forwards
La Liga players
Segunda División players
Segunda División B players
Tercera División players
Betis Deportivo Balompié footballers
Real Betis players
FC Barcelona players
Gimnàstic de Tarragona footballers
Racing de Ferrol footballers
Levante UD footballers
CD Lugo players
Spain youth international footballers
Spain under-23 international footballers
Spain international footballers
Spanish football managers
Segunda División B managers
Tercera División managers
FC Jumilla managers